Skye (formerly IN2IT) is a South Korean boy band consisting of six members, Yoo Ji-ahn, Jung Yeon-tae, Hwang In-ho, Han Hyun-uk, Lee In-pyo, and Isaac Voo, who previously participated in Mnet's 2016 survival show Boys24. The group debuted on October 26, 2017 with Carpe Diem. Originally an eight-piece ensemble, Jinsub departed from the group in March 2018, while Sunghyun departed on September 4, 2019.

Name
The group name, In2It, gives a direct meaning "Intuit" as well the phrase "In to it" which bring together the meaning "the boys will make fans fall into their intuitive charms".

History

2017–2019: Formation and debut
All of the members of In2It came from the pre-debut program Boys24, who made a total of 260 concert performances during their one-year and six months Mesa Hall Concert performance and training period from early 2016 till late 2017. In early 2016, a total of 5,500 applicants had auditioned for Boys24, to which only a small number of less than thirty people were selected as Boys24 members to enroll in the program for one year and six months, before eight members were selected to debut in the group In2It.

In2It debuted with their EP Carpe Diem which signifies the shift from 'boy' to 'man'. The first mini album, which was released on October 26, 2017, consists of songs from composer Duble Sidekick, Cha Cha Malone and Paul Rein. The lead single, "Amazing", is a dance-pop song with chill trap sounds in tropical beat. The music video for the lead single "Amazing" was filmed in Kolsai Lake National Park, Kazakhstan, on September 13, 2017.

In2It made their debut on M Countdown on October 26, 2017 with the song "Amazing" from the album Carpe Diem, and on November 9 the song charted fifth place on the M Countdown Chart. In2It held 'In2It showcase "Carpe Diem" in Japan' from December 3 to 10, 2017. In2It held four concerts called "In2It Winter Paradise" in South Korea on December 24 and 25, 2017. In2It attended "2018 Taipei High City" New Year's Eve Countdown Party on December 31, 2017. In2It make their first Asia Tour to Singapore, Malaysia and Indonesia on February 2, February 4 and 10, 2018.

On March 26, 2018 MMO Entertainment announced, that Kim Ri-ho would not be continuing with the group as he has been suffering from Ménière's disease.

On April 19, 2018, In2It made their comeback with a single titled "Snapshot". In2It performed the song "Snapshot" as well as "Be Bop Baby" in KCON Japan on April 15, 2018 ahead of their comeback. They further performed in "Power of K Live" in Japan on April 30, and in "Dream Concert" held in Seoul World Cup Stadium on May 12, 2018.

In2It released their second single titled "Into The Night Fever" featuring three songs "Sorry For My English", "Geronimo" and "It's U" on July 26, 2018. In2It performed in Korea Music Festival held in Sky Gocheok Stadium on August 1, 2018. In2It performed in KCON LA on August 11, 2018

On September 4, 2019, it was announced Sunghyun would leave the group.

2020–2022: Departure from MMO and military service
After discussions with both the members and their agency, the group's contract was terminated on January 31, 2020, and the group is to move forward independently.

Due to Covid-19, the Korean members decided to fulfill their mandatory military service together while their foreign member Isaac stayed in his home country Malaysia for the time being. Their leader Inpyo returned from military on May 8th, 2022 right after finishing his last performance for the military musical "A Song Of Meissa" where he participated alongside fellow In2it member Hyunuk and EXO's Chanyeol.

Jiahn, Inpyo, and Hyunuk held an online and offline fanmeeting while Isaac was still in Malaysia preparing for his solo debut after signing a solo contract with Prodigee Asia. Yeontae has finished his military service in August 2022, while Inho still has to finish his military service in September 2022.

On March 16, 2023, it was announced that In2it would be rebranding under the new group name, SKYE.

Members
 Yoo Ji-ahn (유지안)
 Jeong Yeon-tae (정연태)
 Hwang In-ho (황인호)
 Han Hyun-uk (한현욱)
Isaac Voo (아이젝, 邬凯名/鄔凱名)
 Lee In-pyo (이인표)

Former members
 Kim Ri-ho (김리호)
 Kim Sung-hyun (김성현)

Discography

Extended plays

Single albums

Singles

Soundtrack appearances

Concerts & Tours

Asia Showcase Tour

IN2IT X ION Tour

Filmography
In2It has filmed some professional filmography. The professional shot film are as listed below.

 Get In2It (Naver/V Live, 2017)
 In2It X LieV  (Naver/V Live, 2017)
 Game Life Bar (a tvN digital original) (tvN/YouTube/Facebook, 2017)
 It's your first time in Hell, Right (Mnet/Facebook/MNET VOD, 2017)
 In2It X Rooftop Live (Naver/V Live, 2018)
 Genie Idol - In2It (Idol Show K-rush3)(KBS World, 2018)
 In2It X Casper Radio (Naver/V Live, 2018)
 [Pops in Seoul] Come on! In2It (인투잇)'s Spin The Roulette (Naver/Arirang K-pop, 2018)
 ''[Idol League] Come On! In2It (인투잇)! (Stark) (Facebook/Twitter/YouTube, 2018)

References

External links

  Official Japanese Website

K-pop music groups
Musical groups established in 2017
South Korean boy bands
South Korean dance music groups
South Korean pop music groups
Musical groups from Seoul
2017 establishments in South Korea
Peak Time contestants